Rhos Fullbrook is a Site of Special Scientific Interest in Ceredigion, west Wales.

See also
List of Sites of Special Scientific Interest in Ceredigion

References

Sites of Special Scientific Interest in Ceredigion